The Münzbach is a river of Saxony, Germany. It is a left tributary of the Freiberger Mulde, which it joins near Freiberg.

See also
List of rivers of Saxony

Rivers of Saxony
Freiberg
Rivers of Germany